A calzón quita'o (English title: The Naked Truth) is a Venezuelan telenovela written by Carlos Pérez and produced by RCTV in 2001. The telenovela was distributed internationally by RCTV International.

On August 8, 2001, RCTV started broadcasting A calzón quita'o weekdays at 9:00 PM. The last episode was broadcast on March 15, 2002 with Juana la Virgen replacing it the following day.

Alba Roversi and Carlos Cruz star as the main protagonists with Jennifer Rodríguez, Jerónimo Gil and Nacarid Escalona as the antagonists.

Plot
Pedro Elias and Clara are two souls who are meant for each other. Pedro is a brilliant lawyer that works for the common people while Clara is a passionate and courageous journalist. However, both of them are suffocated by their marriages. Pedro is married to Aida, a selfish and superficial woman who always blames him for working without pay and Clara to Paulino, a corrupt government official. When Clara is sent to do a story on a lawyer who defends the poor and the free, the two will come together to find happiness fulfilling one of their greatest desires: to promote a future of justice and hope in a region plagued by corruption. They star in this unique story told honestly, openly and reservations, simply ... the whole naked truth.

Cast

References

External links 

A Calzón Quitao (The Naked Truth) at 
A Calzón Quitao / RCTV 2001 at 

2001 telenovelas
RCTV telenovelas
Venezuelan telenovelas
2001 Venezuelan television series debuts
2002 Venezuelan television series endings
Spanish-language telenovelas
Television shows set in Caracas